Vash is an Indian Gujarati-language supernatural horror thriller film directed by Krishnadev Yagnik. It is produced by KS Entertainment, Patel Processing Studios and Ananta Business Corp in collaboration with A Big Box Series Production and distributed by Panorama Studios. Vash was scheduled to be theatrically released on 10 February 2023.

Cast 

 Janki Bodiwala as Aarya 
 Hitu Kanodia as Atharva 
 Niilam Paanchal as Beena
 Aaryan Sanghvi as Ansh
 Hiten Kumar as Pratap

Release 
The film was scheduled to be released on 10 February 2023 in Gujarat.

Reception

Critical reception 
Vash movie received Positive reviews from critics. Shilpa Bhanushali of Mid-Day gave the film 4 stars out of 5 and says "Keeping the audience under a spell of fear with the flavor of Gujarati style, this film is worth watching, but you have to think how much risk you are willing to take". Deepali Chhatwani of The Times of India gave the film 3.5 stars out of 5 and wrote "But it is good to see how the director has kept his team and actors consistent in his last few releases. That rapport with the actors and working with the same team probably helps in understanding the director’s vision and delivering a good film". Dharmendra Thakur of Dainik Jagran gave the film 4 stars out of 5 and wrote "Music is the plus point of this film. The action sequences and cinematography of the film are also strong. From story, acting, direction and cinematography to music, Bahu is one. This film is going to set a new benchmark in Gujarati cinema".

References

External links 

 Vash at Patel Processing Studios
2023 films
Indian thriller films
Indian thriller drama films
Indian psychological thriller films
Indian psychological films
Indian psychological drama films